Thangachi ( Younger sister) is a 1987 Indian Tamil-language drama film, directed by R. Krishnamoorthy, and starring Ramki, Pallavi and Seetha. The film was a remake of Telugu film Aadupaduchu (1986).

Plot
Dharmaraja  is an influential man in politics that's involved in many illegal activities. Inspector Raja curtails many of his illicit businesses in the course of his investigations. Raja's only family is his younger sister, Seetha, and her contractor husband, Prakash. He also meets and falls in love with Radha. Raja arrests Das, an associate of Dharmaraja. Das is soon released on bail and remains defiant towards Raja. Dharmaraja, incensed by Raja's interference with his business, has Prakash disrupt Raja's investigations. Prakash has always been a part of Dharmaraja's team. When a sub-inspector from Raja's team follows Das, he is caught at Prakash's construction site. Dharmaraj, Prakash and Das kill him while Seetha becomes an accidental witness. Assuming that she only saw the other two, Prakash plays the concerned husband but plots to have her murdered. His plan goes awry and Seetha kills Das as he was trying to murder her. Raja must now investigate to free his sister and catch Dharmaraj.

Cast
Ramki as Inspector Raja
Pallavi as Radha
Seetha as Seetha
Nizhalgal Ravi as Prakash
Radha Ravi as Dharmaraja
S. S. Chandran as SS
Senthil as Azhagu
Charle as KD
Kallapetti Singaram as Parivallal

Soundtrack
Soundtrack was composed by S. A. Rajkumar.

Reception
The Indian Express wrote "Dont be fooled by the title; [..] Thangachi uses the sentimental peg only to hang a lot of things more attractive".

References

1987 films
1980s Tamil-language films
Indian action drama films
Films scored by S. A. Rajkumar
1980s action drama films
Tamil remakes of Telugu films
Films directed by R. Krishnamoorthy